Amir ol Mowmenin (also Romanized as Amīr ol Mow’menīn and Amīr al Mūminīn; also known as Amīr Mow’menīn and Amīr ol Mo’menīn) is a village in Asiab Rural District, in the Central District of Omidiyeh County, Khuzestan Province, Iran. At the 2006 census, its population was 831, in 163 families.

References 

Populated places in Omidiyeh County